The 1947 All-Ireland Junior Hurling Championship was the 26th staging of the All-Ireland Junior Championship since its establishment by the Gaelic Athletic Association in 1912.

Kilkenny entered the championship as the defending champions, however, they were beaten in the Leinster Championship.

The All-Ireland final was played on 14 September 1947 at Enniscorthy Sportsfield, between Cork and London, in what was their first ever meeting in the final. Cork won the match by 3–10 to 2–03 to claim their fifth championship title overall and a first title since 1940.

Results

All-Ireland Junior Hurling Championship

All-Ireland semi-finals

All-Ireland home final

All-Ireland final

References

Junior
All-Ireland Junior Hurling Championship